Citizens National Bank may refer to:

Banks
 Citizens National Bank (Eastern Kentucky), headquartered in Paintsville, Kentucky
 Citizens National Bank (Laurel, Maryland)
 Citizens National Bank (Flint, Michigan), later part of Citizens Republic Bancorp
 Citizens National Bank (Cameron, Texas)

Buildings
Citizens National Bank Building (Glenwood Springs, Colorado), listed on the National Register of Historic Places (NRHP)
 Citizens National Bank (Evansville, Indiana), a property listed on the NRHP
 Citizens' National Bank (Worthington, Minnesota), listed on the NRHP in Nobles County
 Citizens National Bank (Springville, New York), a property listed on the NRHP in Erie County
 Citizens National Bank of Latrobe, Pennsylvania, listed on the NRHP
 Citizens National Bank (Parkersburg, West Virginia), a property listed on the NRHP

See also
 Citizens Bank (disambiguation)